The 2000 FIA GT Budapest 500 km was the fifth round the 2000 FIA GT Championship season.  It took place at the Hungaroring, Hungary, on July 2, 2000.

Official results
Class winners in bold.  Cars failing to complete 70% of winner's distance marked as Not Classified (NC).

Statistics
 Pole position – #15 Lister Storm Racing – 1:38.138
 Fastest lap – #15 Lister Storm Racing – 1:39.708
 Average speed – 136.310 km/h

References

 
 

B
FIA GT